Laing House of Plainfield Plantation is a historic house in Edison, Middlesex County, New Jersey, United States, built in the early 18th century when the region was being settled by Scottish Quakers in the late 17th and early 18th century, as recalled in the name of The Plainfields and Scotch Plains. The region was part of the colonial era Elizabethtown Tract and later part of Piscataway Township. It is not certain whether the name derives from the plain clothing worn by the founders or is a reference to the landscape. The house was added to the New Jersey Register of Historic Places and the National Register of Historic Places in 1988.

See also
List of the oldest buildings in New Jersey
National Register of Historic Places listings in Middlesex County, New Jersey

References 

Houses completed in the 18th century
Houses on the National Register of Historic Places in New Jersey
Houses in Middlesex County, New Jersey
Edison, New Jersey
Scottish-American culture in New Jersey
National Register of Historic Places in Middlesex County, New Jersey
New Jersey Register of Historic Places